The beardless barb (Cyclocheilichthys apogon) is a species of freshwater fish in the family Cyprinidae. It is widespread in Southeast Asia. It grows to  total length.

Description
As its name suggests, the species does not have a barbel. There is a black blotch at the caudal base and rows of black spots along the scale rows. It grows to  total length. A study from Borneo found that  standard length was reached at the age of two years.

Habitat 
Beardless barb inhabits a range of freshwater environments: rivers, lowland swamps, marshlands (in flooding time), lakes, and reservoirs. It is a migratory species that enters flooded areas during the high-water season.

Distribution 
The species is found in the Mainland Southeast Asia (Myanmar, Thailand, Cambodia, Laos, Vietnam, Malaysia), including the Mekong and Chao Phraya basins, and in the Maritime Southeast Asia (Singapore, Malaysia, Indonesia), including the islands of Sumatra and Borneo.

Utilization 
Beardless barb is present in local food fisheries. It is also present in the ornamental fish trade.

References

Cyclocheilichthys
Barbs (fish)
Fish of the Mekong Basin
Fish of Cambodia
Freshwater fish of Indonesia
Fish of Laos
Freshwater fish of Malaysia
Fish of Myanmar
Fish of Singapore
Fish of Thailand
Fish of Vietnam
Fish described in 1842